John Frederick Russell (born 4 February 1932) is an Australian former long-distance runner who competed in the 1956 Summer Olympics.

He finished eleventh in the 1958 British Empire and Commonwealth Games marathon.

References

1932 births
Living people
Australian male long-distance runners
Olympic athletes of Australia
Athletes (track and field) at the 1956 Summer Olympics
Commonwealth Games competitors for Australia
Athletes (track and field) at the 1958 British Empire and Commonwealth Games